Madipakkam is residential locality situated in south of Chennai, India. It has been recently placed under the Greater Chennai Corporation.

Demographics 
 India census, Madipakkam had a population of 14,940. Males constitute 51% of the population and females 49%. Madipakkam has an average literacy rate of 98%, higher than the national average of 59.5%: male literacy is 90%, and female literacy is 95%. In Madipakkam, 9% of the population are under 6 years of age.

Location in context
Hospital
Apollo Multispeciality Clinic 044-4560 5000
Apollo Sugar Clinic 0444560500
Apollo Dental Clinic 9150002771

See also 
Raghava Nagar
Subramania Nagar

References

External links 
 Madipakkam Photo Gallery
 Land Grabbing in Maddipakkam
 

Neighbourhoods in Chennai
Suburbs of Chennai